Alison Woollard (born 1968) is a British biologist. She is a lecturer in the Department of Biochemistry at the University of Oxford where she is also a Fellow of Hertford College, Oxford.

Early life 
Woollard was born in 1968 in Kingston-upon-Thames.

Education
Woollard was educated at University of London, gaining her undergraduate degree in Biological Sciences in 1991 and gained her Doctor of Philosophy degree at the University of Oxford on fission yeast supervised by Paul Nurse in 1995.

Research
Woollard moved to the Laboratory of Molecular Biology in Cambridge in 1995.
Her research focuses on developmental biology of the nematode model organism Caenorhabditis elegans particularly RUNX genes.

She is currently the Academic Champion for Public Engagement with Research at the University of Oxford, a post which she has held since 2017.

Awards and honours
In 2013 Woollard presented the Royal Institution Christmas Lectures. She has also been interviewed on the BBC radio programme The Life Scientific.

References

External links
 
 Life Fantastic videos, Royal Institution Christmas Lectures 2013, presented by Alison Woollard

English biologists
British women biologists
Living people
1968 births
Alumni of the University of London
Alumni of the University of Oxford
Fellows of Hertford College, Oxford
People from Kingston upon Thames
Academics of the University of Oxford
British women scientists